Go 2 is the second studio album by the English band XTC, released 6 October 1978 on Virgin Records. The United Kingdom version contained no singles, but the American and Canadian versions included the single "Are You Receiving Me?" (released 27 October 1978). A promotional video was also made for the song.

Background 
By August 1978, XTC were prepared to record their follow-up to White Music. The band had contacted Brian Eno to produce after they learned that he was a fan, but he declined, telling them that they were good enough to produce themselves. Virgin rejected Eno's advice, and the group instead returned to Abbey Road with producer John Leckie. One of the album's tracks, "Battery Brides (Andy Paints Brian)", was written in tribute to Eno.

Keyboardist Barry Andrews appeared at the sessions with several original songs, but frontman Andy Partridge did not feel they were right for the band. He began taking bassist Colin Moulding and drummer Terry Chambers out for drinks without inviting Partridge, allegedly in an attempt to take over the group. After most of Andrews' songs were dropped from the final track list, the keyboardist told journalists that he foresaw the band "explod[ing] pretty soon".

An earlier version of "Are You Receiving Me?" was recorded during the Go 2 sessions and was later released on the 2005 boxed set Coat of Many Cupboards. Other outtakes from Go 2 include "Sargasso Bar", "Us Being Us", "Instant Tunes", "Looking for Footprints", "Things Fall to Bits" and "Strange Tales, Strange Tails".

Title and packaging
The album's title was chosen in reference to the board game Go in order to continue the black-and-white colour scheme from White Music. The "2" was added by Andrews. Its cover was designed and executed by Hipgnosis. It consists of an essay about how album covers are used to attract buyers of the album. On the first British pressings of the LP version of the Go 2 album the track listing on the vinyl disc label mimicked the type style of the cover art. The label is crammed full of text. In some non-English speaking countries, the group shot that was featured on the album's inner sleeve in the UK was used instead as the album cover. The French 13-track album, including the bonus track "Are You Receiving Me?", was one of the releases that featured this sleeve. Yugoslavia was another country that issued this version of the sleeve.

The essay would change depending on the medium (vinyl or CD) and label (Virgin, Epic or Geffen) the album was released on. A separate essay was prepared for cassette editions in the UK.

Release and Go+ 

Go 2 was released in October 1978 to positive reviews and a number 21 chart peak. Like White Music, it was given praise in Sounds, Melody Maker, and the NME. The initial 15,000 pressings of the album came with a bonus disc of five dub remixes entitled Go+. In 1990, these tracks were included on the compilation Explode Together: The Dub Experiments 78-80.

Track listing

CD issues prior to 2001 placed the bonus track between the original sides one and two of the album.

Go+
Bonus EP included with initial LP pressings – later included on Explode Together: The Dub Experiments 78-80. Track notes adapted from XTC: Song Stories (1998), by XTC and Neville Farmer.

Personnel
XTC
Andy Partridge – guitars and vocals
Colin Moulding – bass and vocals
Barry Andrews – Crumar organ, Farfisa organ, Wurlitzer electric piano, Minimoog, Clavinet, grand piano, vocals and saxophone
Terry Chambers – drums and vocals

Additional personnel
John Leckie – production/engineering
Martin Rushent – associate production (uncredited)
Haydn Bendall – engineering assistance (Abbey Road unit)
Pete James – assistant engineer (Abbey Road unit)
Andy Llewelyn – engineering assistance (Matrix unit)
Jess Sutcliffe – engineering assistance (Matrix unit)
Dave Eagle – photography
Hipgnosis – cover artwork

Charts

References

XTC albums
1978 albums
Albums with cover art by Hipgnosis
Virgin Records albums
Albums produced by John Leckie